Botany Bay is a 1953 American drama film directed by John Farrow and starring Alan Ladd, James Mason and Patricia Medina. It was based on a novel of the same name by Charles Nordhoff and James Norman Hall.

While the story includes characters loosely based on real figures (Gilbert and Phillips) and the ship Charlotte, it is a largely fictional telling of the First Fleet's arrival in Australia in 1788.

Plot
In 1787 a group of prisoners lodged in Newgate Jail receive notice that their death sentences are commuted to life imprisonment in New South Wales. Gilbert, the captain, offers one pretty female prisoner free run of the ship on certain conditions.

One prisoner, Tallant, admits guilt but is expecting a pardon to arrive within  hours. The captain declines to wait for word of the pardon and Tallant jumps overboard. When caught he is sentenced to 50 lashes with a cat-o-nine-tails. Recovering below deck he offers £1000 to any person who agrees to help him. As Tallant has medical training he is offered a position as ship's surgeon, which also gives him free run of the ship.

Gilbert is cruel to prisoners and crew alike. A young boy in a small cell dies of hypothermia when the cell floods with cold water. He is buried at sea. His mother tries to stab the captain and he shoots her. Tallant and the second mate escape in a row boat but are found. They are sentenced  to be keel hauled. The crew carries out the sentence but both prisoners survive. The captain is upset that they are living, so orders a second haul. Spencer dies on the second haul. Tallant survives. Rev. Thynne threatens to inform Governor Philip of the barbarity when they arrive at Botany Bay.

The ship sails via South America (this would have been very unusual, the Africa route was the norm). Their first port of call is Rio de Janeiro. However, they later discuss being off the coast of Africa. The journey has taken 237 days.

Governor Phillip refuses to hang Tallant and sentences him to hard labour in the penal colony in Botany Bay, New South Wales. However Gilbert demands that Tallant be charged with mutiny. Despite the fact that the Mutiny Act 1703 only has provisions to punish members of the Royal Navy (which Tallant clearly is not, even were the Charlotte a Royal Navy ship) Governor Phillip raises no objection to this. Tallant escapes with a small group of men, and tracks down Gilbert at Stillwater Cove. He demands the Charlotte, but he and his men are surrounded by British troops and recaptured.

As a further twist the group is surrounded by aborigines. Gilbert is hit by a spear and killed before the British fire power pushes them back. As the prisoners now have muskets they take charge again. Rather than escape Tallant returns to Botany Bay.

Cast
 Alan Ladd as Hugh Tallant
 James Mason as Captain Paul Gilbert
 Patricia Medina as Sally
 Sir Cedric Hardwicke as Governor Arthur Phillip
 Jonathan Harris as Tom Oakly
 Malcolm Lee Beggs as Nick Sabb
 Murray Matheson as Rev. Mortimer Thynne
 Anita Sharp-Bolster as Moll Cudlip (billed as Anita Bolster)
 Noel Drayton as first mate Spencer
 Ben Wright as deck officer Green
 Skelton Knaggs prisoner at Newgate

Production
There was film interest in the book even before its publication because of the success of Mutiny on the Bounty, also from a novel by Nordhoff and Hall. The film rights were sold in July 1940 for a reported $50,000 and was intended to be a vehicle for Joel McCrea.

In 1941 Joel McCrea expressed interest in playing the lead. The film was originally planned to be made in 1946, starring Ray Milland with location shooting in Australia. However these plans were delayed when Paramount became concerned about the cost.

The project was re-activated in 1951 as a vehicle for Alan Ladd.

Four koalas and two kangaroos were flown from Australia to appear in the film. The koalas were the first to be exported from Australia in 25 years and were later transferred to San Diego Zoo.

The only Australian-born members of the cast were Murray Matheson and Brandon Toomey. Aboriginal characters were played by African-American actors.

Historical basis
A ship called , under the command of Captain Thomas Gilbert, sailed with the First Fleet. However, none of the events attributed to "Captain Paul Gilbert" in the film occurred in reality.

References

External links
 Botany Bay at IMDB
 Botany Bay at Turner Classic Movies
Complete novel at Project Gutenberg

1950s adventure drama films
1953 films
American adventure drama films
1950s English-language films
Films scored by Franz Waxman
Films based on American novels
Films directed by John Farrow
Films set in New South Wales
Films set in 1787
Paramount Pictures films
Seafaring films
1953 drama films
1950s American films